Kimchi Family is a 2011 South Korean television series, starring Song Il-gook, Park Jin-hee, Lee Min-young and Choi Jae-sung. Song plays a gangster who turn overs a new leaf and begins working at a kimchi restaurant run by two sisters. The series aired on jTBC from December 7, 2011 to February 23, 2012 on Wednesdays and Thursdays at 20:45 (KST) time slot for 24 episodes.

Synopsis
Lee Kang-san (Park Jin-hee) and Lee Woo-Joo (Lee Min-young) are sisters who suddenly have to take over running their family's traditional kimchi restaurant Chunjiin ("Heaven, Earth, and Man") after their father leaves without notice. The sisters must keep the restaurant going on their own, but they get some help from a troubled man, Ki Ho-tae (Song Il-gook), who shows up at the restaurant looking for his missing past. Ho-tae is an orphan who grew up to become a member of a crime syndicate. But he starts a new life as a worker at Chunjiin where he discovers the perks of having an excellent palate. Together with the other restaurant employees, long-time customers, and a growing circle of friends, they work towards their individual goals while finding warmth and family through their sharing of food and support of each other.

Cast

 Song Il-kook as Ki Ho-tae
 Park Jin-hee as Lee Kang-san
 Lee Min-young as Lee Woo-Joo
 Choi Jae-sung as Kang Do-shik
 Kang Shin-il as Lee Ki-chan
 Kim Young-hoon as Oh Hae-joon
 Yoon Hee-soo as Na Eun-bi
 Lee Dae-geun as Elder Seol
 Kim Byeong-chun as Han Pyung-man
 Lee Il-hwa as Jung Geum-joo
 Lee Kan-hee as Kang-san's mother
 Choi Yong-min as Oh Myung-cheol
 Jung Ae-ri as Jung Hyun-sook
 Choi Deok-moon as Jo Dae-shik
 Kim Sang-hoon as Kim Dong-soo
 Jo Jae-wan as Park Hyun-soo
 Oh Yong as Jo Mi-nam
 Kim Ki-bok as Detective
 Lee A-rin as Bo-yo
 Hwang Young-hee as So-jung
 Cho Yeon-woo as Choi Yong-bin
 Kim Ha-eun as Ji-hyun 
 Shin Hyun-tak as Sung-jin 
 Kim Bo-mi as Hye-young 
 Shin Hyun-been as Yukie 
 Choi Jae-sup as Yoo Jung-ho
 Kim Kyu-chul as Jung Sung-min
 Cha Hyun-woo
 Kim Ga-eun

International broadcast
 Philippines: TV5
 Iran: IRIB Namayesh TV - aired from March 26 to April 18, 2015, every day at 19:00.
 Thailand: True Asian Series

References

External links
  
 Kimchi Family at Naver 
 

Korean-language television shows
2011 South Korean television series debuts
2012 South Korean television series endings
JTBC television dramas
South Korean romance television series
South Korean comedy television series